1948 War usually refers to the 1948 Palestine war, which had two phases:
 1947–48 Civil War in Mandatory Palestine, civil war period
 1948 Arab–Israeli War, war between Israel and a coalition of Arab forces

It may also refer to:
 Alwaziri coup, a violent civil war in Yemen
 Costa Rican Civil War, civil war between government and rebels